Paul Jude Hardy (born October 18, 1942) is an American attorney from Baton Rouge, in the U.S. state of Louisiana, who was the first Republican to have been elected lieutenant governor of the U.S. state of Louisiana since Reconstruction. He served in the second-ranking post under Governor Buddy Roemer from 1988 to 1992.

Background

Hardy's parents, who married in 1939, were Florent Hardy Sr. (1913–2003) and the former Agnes Angelle (1904–2008) of Cecilia in St. Martin Parish. Agnes Angelle was a homemaker, schoolteacher, and principal who was visited at school by former state education superintendents T. H. Harris and Shelby M. Jackson. Agnes's brother, Bob Angelle, and hence the maternal uncle of Paul Hardy, was a Democratic member of the Louisiana House of Representatives from 1934 to 1964 and House Speaker from 1957 to 1960.

Agnes's father, and hence Paul Hardy's maternal grandfather, was Drauzin Angelle, a constable, deputy sheriff, and a Democratic power broker in St. Martin Parish during much of the first half of the 20th century. Paul Hardy has a sister, Mary Agnes Belleau and her husband, Dr. Charles Dewey Belleau, of Baton Rouge, and a brother, Florent Hardy Jr., Ph.D., a long time employee of Louisiana State Archives and 2014 Public Official of the Year by the Louisiana Association of Museums.

Hardy was born in Lafayette, Louisiana. In 1960, he graduated from Cecilia High School. In 1965, he received his bachelor's degree from the University of Louisiana at Lafayette, then the University of Southwestern Louisiana, from which his mother also graduated. While Hardy was on the USL track team, he won the Gulf States Conference high jump competition for two consecutive years.

In 1966, Hardy received his law degree from Loyola University College of Law in New Orleans, and at the age of twenty-three, he began practicing law in St. Martinville with the firm Willis and Hardy.

State senator and secretary of state

In 1972, Hardy was elected as a Democratic state senator from Iberia and St. Martin parishes. The defunct Baton Rouge State Times named him the "Outstanding Newcomer" of the year after his first legislative session in 1972. He served alongside  fellow Democrat Carl W. Bauer, who represented St. Mary and St. Martin parishes.

In 1974, state Senator Hardy was named "Conservationist of the Year" among the elected official category by the Louisiana Wildlife Federation.

In 1975, Hardy was elected, again as a Democrat, as Louisiana Secretary of State in another upset. An opening appeared when veteran Secretary of State Wade O. Martin Jr., who was then a Democrat but later switched to the Republican Party, stepped down to launch an unsuccessful gubernatorial attempt. Hardy came from behind to beat his fellow Democratic opponent, State Representative P.J. Mills of Shreveport. In the primary, Mills had led with 49 percent of the vote. Hardy narrowly prevailed in the runoff—officially the general election in Louisiana. He polled 388,780 votes (51.5 percent) to Mills' 366,510 (48.5 percent).

Running for governor at 37

In 1979, Hardy ran for governor. Endorsed by former Governor John McKeithen, he carried eighteen parishes in the nonpartisan blanket primary, but he missed securing a general election berth by 4 percentage points. Hardy finished in fourth place with 227,026 votes (16.6 percent). In a disputed third place was outgoing Lieutenant Governor James E. "Jimmy" Fitzmorris Jr., of New Orleans, with 280,760 (20.6 percent). The general election would feature Republican David C. Treen of Jefferson Parish, with 297,674 (21.8 percent), and Louisiana Public Service Commissioner Louis J. Lambert of Ascension Parish, with 283,277 (20.7 percent). Hardy hence lost a general election slot by some 56,000 votes. Fitzmorris filed suit in the 19th Judicial District Court in Baton Rouge, but Judge Douglas Gonzales, a Republican, ruled that Fitzmorris failed to provide evidence that enough fraudulent votes were cast for Lambert to impact the outcome of the second-place candidacy.

Though he was still then a Democrat, Hardy endorsed Treen over Lambert. In 1978, he had supported the Republican Jimmy Wilson, a former state representative from Vivian for Louisiana's 4th congressional district seat in Congress, rather than the successful Democrat, Buddy Leach of Leesville. In 1976, Hardy endorsed then U.S. President Gerald R. Ford Jr., over Jimmy Carter of Georgia, who polled Louisiana's ten electoral votes.

Thereafter, Treen, who narrowly defeated Lambert in the general election, appointed Hardy as Louisiana's secretary of transportation. While there, he supervised the spending of a record $2 billion on highways.

When Hardy vacated the secretary of state's position, the two top votegetters, Sandra Thompson, director of the Atchafalaya Basin Culture, Recreation, and Tourism project, and State Senator James H. "Jim" Brown of Ferriday, went into a general election showdown. Brown emerged a narrow winner.

Republican lieutenant governor

Hardy switched parties and ran as a Republican in 1987 for lieutenant governor. First though he was for two weeks in January 1987 a gubernatorial candidate once again. After intraparty rival, U.S. Representative Bob Livingston of suburban New Orleans, defeated Hardy by a five-to-one margin at a caucus straw poll in Alexandria, Hardy said that he would not be a disrupting factor in the race. He therefore endorsed Livingston and incorrectly predicted that Livingston would be elected governor that year.

Instead, Hardy faced five opponents in the race for lieutenant governor, including the two-term Democratic  incumbent, Robert Louis "Bobby" Freeman of Plaquemine in Iberville. Also in the race with Freeman and Hardy was Democrat William Ford "Bill" Dodd of Baton Rouge, son of former Democratic Lieutenant Governor Bill Dodd, who served from 1948 to 1952. Primary results gave Freeman 586,335 (40 percent), Hardy 429,906 (29 percent), and Dodd 242,519 (17 percent). Three other Democrats polled a total of 14 percent of the primary vote.

In the general election held on November 21, 1987, Hardy upset Freeman, 521,992 (53 percent) to 460,199 (47 percent). While Hardy was winning as lieutenant governor, State Representative W. Fox McKeithen, son of John McKeithen, was elected to Hardy's former position as secretary of state. Incumbent Secretary of State James H. "Jim" Brown, originally from Ferriday in Concordia Parish, who had succeeded Hardy in 1980, had vacated the post to make an ill-fated run for governor.

As lieutenant governor, Hardy led the way to enact legislation creating "Tax Free Shopping," which still today gives foreigners an incentive to visit Louisiana. In turn, this concept has resulted in increases in tourism-related jobs, and in 1989 alone increased tourist spending by a record $1.2 billion.

In 1985, Hardy had assisted local entrepreneurs in the production of the full-length feature film of the Cajun movie Belizaire the Cajun which was filmed in at Acadian Village in Lafayette. He was the associate producer and played a bit part in the movie. Under his leadership thereafter as lieutenant governor, the economic impact of the movie industry increased by $51 million.

In 1989, Phi Kappa Theta national fraternal organization presented Hardy with the "Man of Achievement" award. In 1991, he was presented with "The Order of the Plimsoll," the highest award of the New Orleans World Trade Center.

Defeat in 1991

Hardy was defeated for reelection as lieutenant governor in 1991 by the Democrat Melinda Schwegmann of New Orleans, daughter-in-law of Jefferson Parish state legislator, gubernatorial candidate in 1971, and grocery mogul John G. Schwegmann Jr., (1911–1995). In the primary, Hardy and Schwegmann virtually tied, 624,371 (43 percent) for Schwegmann and 620,199 (also 43 percent) for Hardy.

In the general election, Schwegmann scored a large victory, 1,009,026 (59 percent) to Hardy's 693,412 (41 percent). There was speculation that Schwegmann benefited from coattails of Democratic gubernatorial nominee Edwin Washington Edwards, who won his fourth nonconsecutive term as governor in that same election over the controversial Republican David Duke. Edwards polled 1,057,031 votes (61 percent) to Duke's 671,009 (39 percent). Hardy hence ran just some 22,000 votes above Duke's tabulation. Hardy thereafter retired from politics.

After she left the office of lieutenant governor, Schwegmann switched to the  Republican Party. After a stint in the legislature, she attempted to regain the lieutenant governorship in the 2003 jungle primary but was badly defeated by  Democrat Mitch Landrieu, brother of U.S. Senator Mary Landrieu. Jay Dardenne, like Hardy a former state senator and secretary of state, became the second Republican to hold the position of lieutenant governor, the winner of a special election in 2010 to succeed Mitch Landrieu, who was elected mayor of New Orleans.

Private life in Baton Rouge

Hardy is an attorney, banker, businessman, and political consultant residing in Baton Rouge with his wife Sandra "Sandi" Gatlin Hardy (also born 1943), a native of Grant Parish in north Louisiana. They have two children and two granddaughters. Gregory Paul Hardy (born 1966)  his wife, Dedi, and their daughter Heather Gayle Hardy reside in  Baton Rouge, Louisiana, where he practices law. Daughter Yvette Rachal Hardy Gross is a ULL graduate residing in Baton Rouge with her husband, Darrell Gross, along with their daughter  Jessica Yvette Gross.

References

1942 births
Living people
Lieutenant Governors of Louisiana
Louisiana lawyers
Louisiana state senators
Louisiana Democrats
Louisiana Republicans
Louisiana Ragin' Cajuns men's track and field athletes
American athlete-politicians
Loyola University New Orleans College of Law alumni
Cajun people
People from St. Martinville, Louisiana
Politicians from Baton Rouge, Louisiana
Secretaries of State of Louisiana